Vyacheslav Repin (Russian: Вячеслав Борисович Репин; French: Viatcheslav Répine) is a French writer of Russian extraction, born 1960 in Tomsk (Siberia). He writes in French and Russian and is the author of novels, short stories and essays.

Life 

Still student, he has been persecuted in the Soviet Union for his political opinions and was asked in 1985 to leave the country, as a consequence of diplomatic talks on a gaz contract concluded at the time between France and the Soviet Union, and of vigorous press campaigns in his favour launched by the French media (Le Monde: Jan  Krauze, Libération: V. Soulé, Le Quotidien de Paris: Georges Dupoy, Jours de France: Victor Franco, Le Point: Jean  Costacristitch, A. F. P.: Pierre Feuilly, France-Soir: Jean-Louis Morillon, Le Matin: Agathe Logeart, La Croix: Béatrice Toulon, Le Parisien: Pascal Bonnefille, Europe 1: Philippe Lefait, RTL: Thierry Demaizières, TF1: Michel Bousquet, Gabriel Mérétik and Dominique Martinaud, Antenne 2: Hervé Brusini, Rachid Arab and Bernard Langlois, France-Inter: Marie-Christine Thomas and Jacques Pradel, etc. ). Soon after completing his university studies in literature and languages (more about author), Vyacheslav Repin translated into Russian a number of ‘subversive’ French and German texts, including Antonin Arthaud’s (Theatre and its Double), which were then widely circulated in hand-typed copies in USSR (‘samizdat’).

Literary career 

Some time went by before he was noticed as a writer, his exile being the main cause of this temporary anonymity. One of his short stories, The last hunting outing of Piotr Andreevich (La Dernière Chasse de Piotr Andreïévitch), was eventually published in Russia at the end of the 1990s in several thick literary journals, and noticed by the critics for its ‘touchy’ subject.

His first novel, The Stars’ Sickness or the Ripe Years of a Misanthrope (1998), written in France and soon published in Russia by a prestigious publishing house, was a major surprise for the critics: it was unusually wide-ranging (130 chapters, 1200 pages...), looked at the inner reality of the Russian culture from an unexpected distance, and, furthermore, was entirely at odds with the post-modernists who were then widely popular in Russia.

Novy Mir, Moscow, 1999, №6. Critic:

«I shall begin with what normally people finish - from the main accent: we have possibly before us one of the most interesting text and most important work of these last years...

The Star's Sickness is a massive work. Compared to it, the extensive writings of these last years in Russia (Underground from Makanin, Round Dance from Utkin, the heap of words of the philologist Prorokov VGA from the last Booker list) look average narratives, and the usual ‘average Russian’ format - a short-story... 
It is a pity that this world outlook is lost in Russia. Bad that it does not stay anywhere to put labours to make it return.»

Among his numerous short stories and novellas, Jean et Jacques and The centre of the world (Centre du monde) are worth a particular mention, as well as existential tales for adults, some of which were published in French.

His novel Antigonia, written in French, appeared in France, and later in Russia in a different version, written by the author himself in his native language.

His first two novels were nominated for most of the major literary prizes in Russia (Russian Booker Prize, Big Book).

His last novel of scope, The Chamaeleons, written in Russian, is currently being translated into French. This is a major and important text, dealing with today’s Russia, with war, with the Chechen question, among other issues, in the face of existential problems of our (and indeed any) age.

His stylistic and philosophical choices (he writes in both French and Russian and positions himself as ‘a bridge between East and West’) make him an exceptional author. His works subtly but uncompromisingly point at the misguided ways of our epoch, and question the meaning of the torment through which any responsible artist must go today.

a word from V. Repin (translated from French):

It has now been twenty-five years since I chose to settle in France. Almost a lifetime! Having lived between two worlds, having experienced the Cold War, the ups and downs of today’s life, I have recently founded a publishing house in Paris – not only to defend and promote a certain type of Literature, but also to share my experience...

The life of French people has become part of my existence. The life of the Russians is of no less concern to me. As any other life, in point of fact, for I am a writer… I believe that I am invested with the duty to contribute to a better understanding of my native country, of which I – at last – have perceived and understood things that are often missed by those who live too closely to its reality and who do not have the benefit of the distance that my second life in France has given me. Things that are also missed by those who live too far. The French reader will ultimately grasp that the problems of Russian life may seem to be ‘rougher’, but only because circumstances and countries are different; the human heart is one and the same, that which makes the human being live and die. Likewise for the Russian reader.

The gap that exists between individual people often comes down, in my opinion, to a question of a different order, but one that brings everything back to the required level of gravity: evil… does it really exist? Has it not entered, too, in the Pantheon of men so highly revered? Quite simply. Is it not the fruit of imagination – human imagination? Surely, men and none other make this world impossible to comprehend and to live in...

Literature will never be a cure. But sometimes it gives more meaning to life than it may seem...

References

External links
 vyacheslavrepin.com - Personal website

Antigonia, Roman, Éditions Temps & Périodes, Paris, 2008,

La Dernière Chasse de Piotr Andreïévitch, récit, version française

The Chamaeleons, novel, 2010

BookMate, e-book's library, Russia

Russian male novelists
Russian male short story writers
Living people
1960 births
People from Tomsk